The Southern California Law Review is the flagship scholarly journal of the USC Gould School of Law. The law review was established in 1927, and its students publish six issues in each annual volume.

External links
 

American law journals